Johannah Curran (born 9 December 1986) is an Australian netball player. In 2008, Curran played for the Melbourne Vixens in the ANZ Championship. Curran played for the West Coast Fever in the 2009, 2010 and 2011 seasons. In 2012 she took a year away from netball and in 2013, she returned to play for the Melbourne Vixens.

References
2008 Melbourne Vixens profile. Retrieved on 2008-06-13.
2009 West Coast Fever profile. Retrieved on 2009-03-13.

1986 births
Living people
Australian netball players
West Coast Fever players
Melbourne Vixens players
ANZ Championship players
Melbourne Phoenix players
Netball players from Victoria (Australia)
Australia international Fast5 players
Victorian Fury players
Australian Netball League players